Saltstraumen Church is a parish church of the Church of Norway in Bodø Municipality in Nordland county, Norway. It is located in the village of Saltstraumen. It is one of the two churches for the Saltstraumen parish which is part of the Bodø domprosti (deanery) in the Diocese of Sør-Hålogaland. The white, wooden church was built in a long church style in 1886 using plans drawn up by the architect J. E. Olsen. The church seats about 370 people.

History
The church was originally built in 1886. The cemetery remained at the original site.

Media gallery

See also
List of churches in Sør-Hålogaland

References

Churches in Bodø
Churches in Nordland
Wooden churches in Norway
19th-century Church of Norway church buildings
Churches completed in 1886
1886 establishments in Norway
Long churches in Norway